Queenie is a 1987 ABC miniseries based on the eponymous 1985 novel by writer and producer Michael Korda. Winston Beard (a pseudonym for James Goldman) and April Smith adapted the novel for television, with Larry Peerce directing.

Background
In April 1985 Korda published Queenie, a roman à clef about his aunt, actress Merle Oberon, who had married his uncle Alexander Korda. In May 1987, Queenie aired in two parts on ABC.

Plot
Queenie Kelley (Oberon had been known earlier in life as "Queenie O'Brien" and "Queenie Thompson") is an extremely beautiful girl of Indian and Irish descent, fair enough to pass for white. Growing up in Calcutta, however, Queenie is made all too aware of her "chee-chee" (mixed) background by her enemies, specifically wealthy Prunella Rumsey.

One of Prunella's mother's lovers, however, is Queenie's uncle, Morgan Jones. When their affair is discovered by Sir Burton Rumsey, he fires Jones from his musician position at the cricket club. Queenie visits with Sir Burton to plead for her uncle's job back, but he does so under the condition Queenie sleeps with him. When she realizes that he has lied to her, she storms out of the mansion, but not before he falls over a balcony and falls to his death. Once at home, Queenie tells her mother and uncle what happened, Jones and Queenie depart for England. Lost in London, Queenie finds a career as a stripper. Later, she makes her way to Hollywood, where she is renamed Dawn Avalon. Avalon becomes one of the biggest stars in Hollywood.

During this time, Queenie deals with complicated relationships while trying to conceal her true identity and avoid jail due to the ongoing investigation of Rumsey's death.

Cast
Mia Sara as Queenie Thompson
Joss Ackland as Sir Burton Rumsey 
Serena Gordon as Prunella Rumsey
Sarah Miles as Lady Sybil
Kirk Douglas as David Konig
Leigh Lawson as Morgan Jones
Gary Cady as Lucien Chambrun
Claire Bloom as Vicky Kelley
Topol as Dimitri Goldner

Critical reception
The New York Times criticized the miniseries for not only being "absurd" but also being politically dated: "Even the details show an insensitivity no longer acceptable in today's global village. Why, for instance, when so many Indian actors have excelled in such productions as A Passage to India and The Jewel in the Crown, do we still have to find Indian characters played by British actors using dark makeup and a singsong accent?"

References

External links

"Queenie: Smudging the distinctions between Black and White", by Mark Haslam

1987 films
1987 television films
1980s American television miniseries
American romantic drama films
Films about immigration
Films about race and ethnicity
Romantic period films
Films based on British novels
Films à clef
1980s English-language films
1980s American films